The  Fairbanks Grizzlies season was the team's third season as a professional indoor football franchise and second in the Indoor Football League (IFL). One of twenty-five teams that competed in the IFL for the 2010 season, the Fairbanks, Alaska-based Fairbanks Grizzlies were members of the Pacific North Division of the Intense Conference.

Under the leadership of owners Chad Dittman, Ricky Bertz, Michael Taylor and head coach Robert Fuller, the team played their home games at the Carlson Center in Fairbanks, Alaska.

Schedule

Regular season

Playoffs

Standings

Roster

References

Fairbanks Grizzlies
Fairbanks Grizzlies
American football in Alaska
Fairbanks Grizzlies